The 2021 Rachael Heyhoe Flint Trophy was the second edition of the Rachael Heyhoe Flint Trophy, an English women's cricket 50-over domestic competition, which took place between 29 May and 25 September 2021. It featured eight teams playing in a round-robin group, followed by a knock-out round. The holders were the Southern Vipers, who won the inaugural competition in 2020. It ran alongside the Charlotte Edwards Cup. The tournament was named after former England captain Rachael Heyhoe Flint, Baroness Heyhoe-Flint, who died in 2017.

Southern Vipers finished top of the group stage, and as a result, they qualified automatically for the final. Northern Diamonds and Central Sparks finished second and third respectively, and so contested the playoff, which was won by the Diamonds to qualify for the final. In the final at the County Ground, Northampton, Southern Vipers won their second Rachael Heyhoe Flint Trophy in two years, beating Northern Diamonds by 3 wickets with 2 balls to spare.

Background and format

The Rachael Heyhoe Flint Trophy was a 50-over cricket tournament created in 2020 so that English women's cricket could be played in spite of the COVID-19 pandemic. A full season was scheduled for 2021, and, due to the popularity of the decision to name the trophy after Rachael Heyhoe Flint, the name was retained. The fixtures took place in two blocks, with the inaugural Charlotte Edwards Cup and The Hundred taking place in between.

The competition featured eight teams that represent regional hubs. Teams played each other once in a group of eight, with the top three qualifying for the knock-out stage. The second-placed team played the third-placed team on the 22 September, with the winner advancing to play the first-placed team in the Final on the 25 September. The Final was played at the County Cricket Ground, Northampton.

Teams
The teams were as follows:
 Central Sparks (representing Warwickshire, Worcestershire, Herefordshire, Shropshire and Staffordshire)
 Lightning (representing Loughborough University, Derbyshire, Leicestershire, Nottinghamshire and Lincolnshire)
 Northern Diamonds (representing Yorkshire, Durham and Northumberland)
 North West Thunder (representing Lancashire, Cheshire and Cumbria)
 South East Stars (representing Surrey and Kent)
 Southern Vipers (representing Hampshire, Sussex, Berkshire, Buckinghamshire, Dorset, Isle of Wight and Oxfordshire)
 Sunrisers  (representing Middlesex, Essex, Northamptonshire, Bedfordshire, Cambridgeshire, Hertfordshire, Huntingdonshire, Norfolk and Suffolk)
 Western Storm (representing Glamorgan, Gloucestershire, Somerset, Cornwall, Devon, Wiltshire and Cricket Wales)

Standings
Teams received 4 points for a win. A bonus point was given where the winning team's run rate was 1.25 or greater times that of the opposition. In case of a tie in the standings, the following tiebreakers would be applied in order: highest net run rate, team that scored the most points in matches involving the tied parties, better bowling strike rate, drawing of lots.

 advanced to Final
 advanced to the Play-off

Group stage

Source:

Play-off
Northern Diamonds and Central Sparks finished second and third respectively in the group stage, and so contested the playoff.

Final
Southern Vipers finished top of the group stage, and as a result, they qualified automatically for the final.

Statistics
Highest score by a team: South East Stars – 324/7 (50 overs) v Sunrisers (29 May).
 Top score by an individual: Amy Jones – 163* (114) v Western Storm (31 May).
 Best bowling figures by an individual: Emily Arlott – 5/29 (8 overs) v Southern Vipers (5 June).

Most runs

Source: ESPNCricinfo

Most wickets

Source: ESPNCricinfo

References

External links
 Series home at ESPN Cricinfo

Rachael Heyhoe Flint Trophy
2021 in English women's cricket